The Chicago Giants were a professional baseball team based in Chicago, Illinois which played in the Negro leagues from 1910 to 1921.

History 

The team was founded by Frank Leland after he and his partner, Rube Foster, split up the Leland Giants in 1910.  Frank Leland's new club was sometimes also known as Leland's Chicago Giants, until a court injunction forced Frank Leland to stop using the name Leland Giants.

A 1910 article about an upcoming game and parade, announced everyone would wear the team colors, "white and maroon."

After Leland's death, November 14, 1914, the team came under the control of longtime player Charles "Joe" Green.

In 1920, the Chicago Giants became a founding member of the Negro National League (NNL).  They played as a travelling team, without a home field, and finished in last place in both 1920 and 1921.  Their best player was a young catcher/shortstop named John Beckwith, who was purchased by Rube Foster for his Chicago American Giants after the 1921 season.

Franchise continuum

References

External links
 1920 Chicago Giants Calendar

Negro league baseball teams
Giants
Defunct baseball teams in Illinois
Baseball teams disestablished in 1921
Baseball teams established in 1910